The Heritage Hall is an historical building in Vancouver, dating back to 1914 and classified by the City as a designated heritage building. It is located on Main Street, in the Mount Pleasant neighborhood. 

The building was designed by architect Archibald Campbell Hope to serve as a post office. Reportedly, the design was derived from a misdirected set of plans that were meant for another city in the Prairies, which got the smaller building meant to have been constructed here. In the 1970s the building was briefly occupied by the Royal Canadian Mounted Police, before being transformed into a community arts venue in the following decade. The Hall stills keeps this function today, besides being used as a venue for weddings and other events.

Trivia 
The building served as a shooting location for The X-Files season 3 episode Grotesque after a catholic hospital that served as a stand-in for the George Washington University library declined to have a gargoyle mounted on the roof for a shot.

Heritage buildings in Vancouver